Rotten Rationing Big Picture Show is a 2013 Horrible Histories exhibition based on the children's history book series, Horrible Histories, originally written by Terry Deary and illustrated by Martin Brown, which explores the life and times of World War II.  The exhibition, created in partnership with Scholastic, debuted at the  Imperial War Museum North in Manchester on 18 May 2013 and will last until 17 May 2015.

Production

Reception

References

Horrible Histories exhibitions